The Samoan flycatcher (Myiagra albiventris) is a species of bird in the family Monarchidae.
It is endemic to Samoa. Its natural habitats are subtropical or tropical moist lowland forests, subtropical or tropical moist montane forests, and rural gardens and is threatened by habitat loss.

Taxonomy and systematics
The Samoan flycatcher was originally described in the genus Platyrhynchus. Alternate names include Samoan broadbill, Samoan Myiagra, Samoan Myiagra flycatcher and white-vented flycatcher.

References

External links
BirdLife Species Factsheet.

Birds of Samoa
Myiagra
Birds described in 1848
Taxonomy articles created by Polbot
Taxa named by Titian Peale